Mercure (Nothomb) is a Belgian novel by Amélie Nothomb. It was first published in 1998.

1998 Belgian novels
Novels by Amélie Nothomb
French-language novels
Éditions Albin Michel books